Street Dogs is the twelfth studio album released by American band Widespread Panic. Recorded at Echo Mountain Recording Studio in Asheville, NC, it was released September 25, 2015.

This marks the first album by the band without drummer, and founding member, Todd Nance although he does receive co-writing credit on every song. It features Duane Trucks on drums. He was not an official member of the band at the time of its recording but had been performing live with them since late 2014. He joined the band as a full member in February 2016.

Lead singer and guitarist John Bell has said in interviews that much of the album was recorded live in studio, with as little overdubbing as possible.

Track listing
All tracks written by John Bell, John Hermann, Jimmy Herring, Domingo S. Ortiz, Dave Schools, Todd Nance and Duane Trucks except where noted.

"Sell Sell" (Alan Price) 6:24
"Steven’s Cat" 4:28
"Cease Fire" 7:51
"Jamais Vu (The World Has Changed)" 7:15
"Angels Don’t Sing the Blues" 5:54
"Honky Red" (Murray McLauchlan) 6:27
"The Poorhouse of Positive Thinking" 5:11
"Welcome to My World" (John Keane) 5:52
"Tail Dragger" (Willie Dixon) 4:50
"Street Dogs for Breakfast" 4:30

Personnel

Widespread Panic
John Bell – lead vocals, guitar
Jimmy Herring – guitar
Domingo S. Ortiz – percussion
Dave Schools – bass, vocals
John Hermann – keyboards, vocals

Additional musicians
Duane Trucks – drums
John Keane – guitar, vocals

Production
John Keane – producer, engineer, mixing
Widespread Panic – producer
Julian Dreyer – assistant engineer
Jim Georgeson – assistant engineer
Clay Miller – assistant engineer
Glenn Schick – mastering
Ellie MacKnight – package coordinator
Andy Tennille – photography

References

External links
Widespread Panic Official Website

2015 albums
Widespread Panic albums
Albums produced by John Keane (record producer)
Vanguard Records albums